The Kleine Kinzig Dam ( or Kleine-Kinzig-Talsperre) is a dam which was commissioned in 1984 in Reinerzau near Freudenstadt in Germany's Black Forest. It lies within the state of Baden-Württemberg and supplies drinking water, provides flood protection, drought protection and power generation using hydropower. It impounds the Kleine Kinzig river; the dam belongs to the  Kleine Kinzig Special Purpose Association (Zweckverband Kleine Kinzig)

The barrier is a rockfill dam with asphalt concrete interior sealing (bituminous core). The dam is made of granite and bunter sandstone and was constructed from May 1981 to October 1982. The initial impoundment of the river lasted from 13 December 1982 to June 1984.

Overflow protection is housed in a tower with a circular spillway in the reservoir, to which a gallery is connected. The rated capacity of the power plant is 580 kW. The reservoir supplies between 3 and 8 million m³ of drinking water annually.

There is also a forebay with a -high dam made of earth and rock from the hillside (Hangschuttmaterial).

The Kleine Kinzig dam should not be confused with the Kinzig Dam near Steinau in Hesse.

See also 
 List of dams in Germany

References

Literature 
 Alwin Eppler: Die Talsperre Kleine Kinzig. Trinkwasser für eine Schwarzwald-Region. Eppe, Aulendorf / Bergatreute 2004, .
 Nationales Komitee für Große Talsperren in der Bundesrepublik Deutschland (DNK) und Deutscher Verband für Wasserwirtschaft und Kulturbau e.V. (DVWK) (Hrsg.), Peter Franke, Wolfgang Frey (Bearb.): Talsperren in der Bundesrepublik Deutschland. Berlin 1987, .
 Trinkwasser aus dem Schwarzwald. (Prospekt des Zweckverbandes Wasserversorgung Kleine Kinzig)

External links 

 Zweckverband Wasserversorgung Kleine Kinzig
 

Dams completed in 1982
Dams in Baden-Württemberg
Lakes of the Black Forest
Freudenstadt (district)
Pumped-storage hydroelectric power stations in Germany
1982 establishments in West Germany